Clemaxia is a genus of flies in the family Pyrgotidae.

Species 
C. adolfifriderici Enderlein, 1942
C. angustiangulata Enderlein, 1942
C. angusticornis Enderlein, 1942
C. angustipalpis Enderlein, 1942
C. flaviventris Mayer, 1953
C. gracilis (Hendel, 1914)

References 

Pyrgotidae
Diptera of Africa
Brachycera genera
Taxa named by Günther Enderlein